Qurtoba  (قرطبة) is one of the districts of Capital Governorate in Kuwait City, Kuwait.

Embassies in Qurtoba 
   Georgia
   Denmark
   Greenland
   Hungary
   Republic of Korea

Districts of Hawalli Governorate